John Richard Cornfield (born 10 December 1958 in Epsom, Surrey) is a British record producer and sound engineer. He has been working from Sawmills Studios in Cornwall since 1982.

Discography

As sound engineer or sound assistant
The Dukes of Stratosphear - Psonic Psunspot (1987)
The Stone Roses - Fools Gold (1989)
Robert Plant - Fate of Nations (1993)
Ride - Carnival of Light (1994)
Cast - All Change (album) (1995)
Jackie Leven - Forbidden Songs of the Dying West (1995)
Supergrass - I Should Coco (1995)
Catatonia - Way Beyond Blue (1996)
Cast - Mother Nature Calls (1997)
Muse - Showbiz (1999)
Muse - Origin of Symmetry (2001)
Muse - Hullabaloo (2002)
Kashmir - Zitilites (2003)
Shed Seven - Where Have You Been Tonight? Live (2003)

As producer
Supergrass - In It for the Money (1997)
Supergrass - Supergrass (1999)
The Bluetones - Science & Nature (2000)
King Adora - Vibrate You (2001)
Serafin - One More Way (EP 2) (2002)
Spunge - The Story So Far... (2002)
Muse - Absolution (2003)
One Minute Silence - One Lie Fits All (2003) 
Kashmir - Zitilites (2003)
Razorlight - Up All Night (2004)(Sphere Studios)
Supergrass - Supergrass Is 10 (2004)
Athlete - Tourist (2005)
Puscha -Holiday World (2005)
Morning Runner - Wilderness Is Paradise Now (2006)
The Days - Debut Album - Untitled (2007–2008)
ASTRO - Head First EP (2009)
The Coronas - Tony Was An Ex-Con (2009)
The Foxes - Depression, Joy and a Moment of Fame (2010)
Kyasma - Symphony For Technology (2012)

External links
 official site

1958 births
British record producers
British audio engineers
Living people
People from Epsom